Keith Reddin (born July 7, 1956) is an American actor and playwright. He received his B.S. in 1978 from Northwestern University and then went on to attend Yale School of Drama until he received his M.A. in 1981.

Reddin grew up in Englewood, New Jersey and attended Dwight Morrow High School.

His plays Life and Limb, Rum and Coke, Highest Standard of Living and But Not for Me all received their world premieres at South Coast Repertory. SCR also produced his adaptation of Alexander Buravsky’s The Russian Teacher.  Other plays include Nebraska, Life During Wartime, Brutality of Fact, All the Rage, The Prophets of Nature and Frame 312.  Adaptations include: Bulgakov's Black Snow, Shatrov's Maybe, Molière's The Imaginary Invalid, Anouilh's Antigone and Thornton Wilder’s Heaven’s My Destination.  Film and television include, Big Time (American Playhouse), The Heart of Justice (TNT), Milken (TNT), The Alarmist, and All the Rage.

Awards 
 1992 Whiting Award

Plays 
Life and Limb (1984)
Rum and Coke (1985)
Big Time (1987)
Nebraska (1989)
The Doors (1991)
Life During Wartime (1990)
Brutality of Fact (1993)
Almost Blue (1994)
You Belong to Me (1995)
All the Rage (1997)
But Not for Me (1998)
Synergy (2000)
Frame 312 (2003)
Human Error (2004)
The Missionary Position (2006)
The Will to Art (2008)
Cleveland Heights (2008)
HmatrixH (2010)
 Acquainted with the Night (2011)

References

External links

Profile at The Whiting Foundation

1956 births
20th-century American dramatists and playwrights
American male film actors
American male stage actors
American male television actors
Dwight Morrow High School alumni
Living people
People from Englewood, New Jersey
Northwestern University alumni
Yale School of Drama alumni